Sidi Mohamed Ould Boubacar (born 31 May 1957) is a Mauritanian politician who was Prime Minister of Mauritania from 1992 to 1996 and again from 2005 to 2007.

Life and career 
Born in Atar in 1957, Boubacar became regional treasurer in Nouadhibou in April 1983 and then technical adviser to the Minister of Finance and Trade in November 1983. In March 1984 he became Treasurer General of Mauritania. Subsequently, during the rule of Maaouya Ould Sid'Ahmed Taya, he became Director of the Supervision of Publicly Owned Establishments in 1985, Director of the Budget in 1986, and Controller General of Finances in 1987. He became Director of the Plan in December 1987, then Director of the Treasury and Public Accounts in April 1988.

Boubacar became Minister of Finance in October 1990 and was named Prime Minister on April 18, 1992. He served in the latter position until he was dismissed by Taya on January 2, 1996. On January 6, 1996 he was elected secretary general of the ruling party, the Democratic and Social Republican Party (PRDS). He became Director of the Presidential Cabinet in 2001 and Mauritania's ambassador to France in 2004. Following a military coup against Taya on August 3, 2005, he returned to the country from France on August 6 and was appointed prime minister on August 7 by Col. Ely Ould Mohamed Vall, head of the Military Council for Justice and Democracy. Boubacar's appointment came shortly after the resignation of Sghair Ould M'Bareck, Taya's last prime minister before his ouster.  Boubacar is a member of the Republican Party for Democracy and Renewal, the successor party of the PRDS.

Like the members of Military Council for Justice and Democracy, Boubacar was not allowed to run for president in the March 2007 Presidential election. Following the election and the confirmation of the results by the Constitutional Council, Boubacar submitted his resignation to Vall on March 31; he was asked to remain in office in a caretaker capacity until the swearing in of the new president, Sidi Ould Cheikh Abdallahi, on April 19, after which Abdallahi appointed Zeine Ould Zeidane as prime minister on April 20.

He was a presidential candidate in the June 2019 elections. On 22 June 2019, he clinched 17.87% electoral votes behind Mohamed Ould Ghazouani (52.01%) and Biram Dah Abeid (18.58) in the election.

References 

1957 births
Living people
People from Adrar Region
Republican Party for Democracy and Renewal politicians
Ambassadors of Mauritania to Spain
Ambassadors of Mauritania to France
Permanent Representatives of Mauritania to the United Nations